Syuz-Pozya is a rural locality (a village) in Oshibskoye Rural Settlement, Kudymkarsky District, Perm Krai, Russia. The population was 161 as of 2010. There are 7 streets.

Geography 
Syuz-Pozya is located 31 km northeast of Kudymkar (the district's administrative centre) by road. Kosva is the nearest rural locality.

References 

Rural localities in Kudymkarsky District